Douglas George (born 21 September 1953), also known as Doug George, is an English former professional footballer who played as a defender in the Netherlands for Haarlem and Sparta Rotterdam. 

He began his career at the Aston Villa Academy in England, and appeared in their 1972 FA Youth Cup winning campaign. In early 1972 George scored two goals for Villa in their 5th round FA Youth Cup replay at Villa Park in a 3–0 win against Chelsea, taking them through to the quarter-finals.

References

1953 births
Living people
Sportspeople from Durham, England
Footballers from County Durham
English footballers
Association football defenders
HFC Haarlem players
Sparta Rotterdam players
Eerste Divisie players
Eredivisie players
English expatriate footballers
English expatriate sportspeople in the Netherlands
Expatriate footballers in the Netherlands
Aston Villa F.C. players